Hadrestia is a genus of flies in the family Stratiomyidae.

Species
Hadrestia aenea Thomson, 1869
Hadrestia digitata (James, 1975)

References

Stratiomyidae
Brachycera genera
Taxa named by Carl Gustaf Thomson
Diptera of South America